"You Know You Like It" is a song by English electronic music duo AlunaGeorge from their debut studio album, Body Music (2013). The track was released in the United Kingdom on 20 April 2012 as the album's lead single. The song peaked at number 39 on the UK Singles Chart in April 2013 after being used in a Tesco advert.

Timed with the release of the album, "You Know You Like It" was re-released on 28 July 2013, as a double A-side with "Bad Idea". It subsequently reached a new peak position of number 39 in the UK Singles Chart on 4 August 2013.

A remix by DJ Snake boosted the song's popularity in the United States, where it became a sleeper hit, peaking at number 13 on the Billboard Hot 100 and reaching number one on both the Billboard Dance/Mix Show Airplay and Rhythmic charts.

Critical reception
The track was met with very positive reviews upon its release. Pitchfork awarded the song their "Best New Music" tag.

Music video
A music video to accompany the release of "You Know You Like It" was first released onto YouTube on August 31, 2011, at a total length of three minutes and thirty seconds. The video is shot in black and white and features clips of Francis dancing.

A second music video was released on June 13, 2013, on YouTube and Vevo. The video shows the duo partying at an empty pool intercut with clips on Francis dancing with backup dancers.

Track listing

Charts

Weekly charts

Year-end charts

DJ Snake remix

French DJ and producer DJ Snake released a remix of the track in 2013. It was uploaded to AlunaGeorge's SoundCloud on July 22, 2013 as an official remix of the song, but was later released as a single on October 20, 2014. This version achieved more chart success in the United States and Europe than the original single.

Music video
The music video to accompany the newest version of the song with DJ Snake has a length of 4:33. The video's protagonist is an ostensible humanoid chimpanzee who has thoughts of suicide due to missing the love of his life and not fitting in. Through the video he seems frustrated with his life, stalking the Instagram of his love and selling drugs. He walks to a gentlemen's club carrying a gun. There, he gets a lap dance to forget his worries, but gropes the dancer and gets beaten up by the bouncers. Afterwards he comes to a realization and decides to change his ways. He throws the gun in the garbage.

Track listing

Charts

Weekly charts

Year-end charts

Decade-end charts

Certifications

Release history

References

External links

2012 singles
2014 singles
2012 songs
AlunaGeorge songs
DJ Snake songs
Island Records singles
Interscope Records singles
Columbia Records singles
Trap music (EDM) songs